Forest Oak may refer to:

A common name for the Australian tree Allocasuarina torulosa
A historical name for Gaithersburg, Maryland, United States
Forest Oak Middle School, a middle school in Gaithersburg, Maryland, see Montgomery County Public Schools
A middle school located in Fort Worth, Texas